Frank Murphy (born May 1944) is an Irish Gaelic games administrator and former referee. He was secretary of the Cork County Board of the Gaelic Athletic Association 1972 to 2018 and has served on numerous Gaelic games committees at national level.  

Murphy is seen as the most powerful figure in Gaelic games in Cork. At times he has been viewed as a divisive figure due to his central involvement in all three strikes by the Cork senior hurling team and Cork senior football team between 2002 and 2009. 

Murphy previously served as a referee at the highest levels, taking charge of numerous All-Ireland deciders, while he was also a selector at all levels with various Cork Gaelic football and hurling teams.

References

1944 births
Living people
All-Ireland Senior Hurling Championship Final referees
Blackrock National Hurling Club hurlers
Gaelic games administrators
Hurling referees
Hurling selectors